Jeff Vaughan (born 26 March 1974) is an Australian cricketer. He played in twenty-eight first-class and twenty-four List A matches for South Australia between 1996 and 2003. In July 2021, along with Michael Di Venuto, Vaughan was appointed as the assistant coach of the Australia national cricket team.

See also
 List of South Australian representative cricketers

References

External links
 

1974 births
Living people
Australian cricketers
South Australia cricketers
Cricketers from Sydney